Lachendorf (West Low German: Lachendörp) is a municipality in the district of Celle, in Lower Saxony, Germany. It is situated approximately 10 km east of Celle.

Lachendorf is also the seat of the Samtgemeinde ("collective municipality") Lachendorf.

History
In older records Lachendorf is mentioned under the name of Lachtendorp, meaning village at the river Lachte. In 1538 Ernest I, Duke of Brunswick-Lüneburg chose it as a proper place for a paper mill, which marks the beginning of settlement and commercial development. In  1845 the paper mill was extended to a factory, creating a remarkable amount of workspace in this agricultural region.

Famous residents 
 Wilhelm Trumann, great-great grandfather of the 33rd president of the USA Harry S. Truman
 Heinrich Severloh (1923–2006), platoon of the Wehrmacht and rifleman on Omaha Beach
 Konstantin Rausch (born 1990), football/soccer player for Hannover 96

International relations

Twin towns – Sister cities
Lachendorf is twinned with:
 Bricquebec, Manche, Normandy, France

References

Bibliography 
 Martin Wittmann, Kurt W. Seebo: Lachendorf. Ed. I, Lachendorf 1988

Sources

External links